The Savior Party of Honduras (PSH, stylised as "Partido Sal✓ador de Honduras"), sometimes translated as the Savior of Honduras Party, is a populist political party in Honduras founded in 2020 by Salvador Nasralla, founder and member of the Anti-Corruption Party until 2017.

History 
On 12 November 2019, Salvador Nasralla presented the Supreme Electoral Tribunal (CNE) with the necessary documents to form a new political party.

The CNE made the registration official on 7 September 2020. The party presented 65,694 signatures, as well as the organization of the departmental and municipal authorities of the party.

Elections 
An alliance was originally proposed for the 2021 presidential election with Luis Zelaya of the Liberal Party (who previously ran and finished third in the 2017 presidential election, and who opposes the candidacy of fellow Liberal Party member Yani Rosenthal, who completed a prison sentence in the United States in 2020 for laundering drug money), Nelson Avila and Wilfredo Méndez of LIBRE and independent candidate Milton Benítez. Eventually, an alliance was agreed to between Zelaya of the Liberal Party and the Innovation and Unity Party. Should one of the candidates in the alliance make it to the second round, they will earn an endorsement from the other(s) who did not qualify.

Electoral history

Presidential elections

National Congress elections

References 

Political parties in Honduras